Alan James Campbell (born 21 January 1948) is a Scottish former professional footballer who played as a central midfielder. He made 571 appearances in the English Football League for Charlton Athletic, Birmingham City, Cardiff City and Carlisle United, including over 100 in the First Division for Birmingham City. He was capped for Scotland at youth and under-23 level. He went on to play and manage in non-League football around the Birmingham area.

Career
Born in Arbroath, Campbell began his career in England with Charlton Athletic, joining the club at the age of 15. The club were only able to sign Campbell on amateur terms, creating a fake job for him at a sporting goods store and paying his accommodation plus £5 a week. He initially suffered from homesickness in London, even returning to Scotland briefly after two weeks at the club, but soon settled and was part of the Charlton youth side that reached the semi-final of the FA Youth Cup. In 1965, Bob Stokoe was appointed manager of the club and handed Campbell his professional debut in the Second Division, on the opening day of the 1965–66 season in a 4–2 defeat to Bolton Wanderers, at the age of 17. He went on to play over 200 times for Charlton before joining Birmingham City in 1970.

References

1948 births
Living people
People from Arbroath
Scottish footballers
Scotland youth international footballers
Scotland under-23 international footballers
Association football midfielders
Charlton Athletic F.C. players
Birmingham City F.C. players
Cardiff City F.C. players
Carlisle United F.C. players
Redditch United F.C. players
English Football League players
Scottish football managers
Highgate United F.C. managers
Stratford Town F.C. managers
Footballers from Angus, Scotland